KIXE-TV, virtual and VHF digital channel 9, is a Public Broadcasting Service (PBS) member television station licensed to Redding, California, United States, and also serving Chico. The station is owned by the Northern California Educational Television Association. KIXE's studios are located along North Market Street on the north side of Redding and its transmitter is located atop Shasta Bally.

History
KIXE went on the air in black and white in 1964. In 1967, the station moved from Chico to Redding. It began broadcasting in color in 1971.

The station was originally located on Industrial Street in Redding. It soon expanded to a bigger facility on North Market Street (State Route 273), north of downtown. The new building had space for television broadcasting courses at Shasta College. Many local media personalities have appeared on KIXE over the years like Cal Hunter, Mike Mangas, Ray Roberts, and Ken Murray.

Digital television

Digital channels
The station's digital signal is multiplexed:

Chico fill-in translator
Viewers in Chico, Paradise, Oroville, Magalia, Orland, and surrounding areas who had originally had trouble receiving KIXE's digital signal from Redding began to notice a substantial improvement with a new fill-in transmitter on Cohasset Ridge that went online on September 21. The 4,000-watt transmitter is located 200 feet up on a transmission tower and rebroadcasts KIXE's regular programming lineup as well as the CREATE channel. The transmitter is broadcast on their pre-transition UHF channel 18, but digital television receivers display the station's virtual channel as channel 9.

Analog-to-digital conversion
KIXE-TV shut down its analog signal, over VHF channel 9, on August 18, 2008. The station's digital signal relocated from its pre-transition UHF channel 18 to VHF channel 9. Translators finally converted on September 1.

Early switch
KIXE is currently broadcasting in a digital format on VHF channel 9. The exclusive digital broadcast began August 22, 2008, well before the then planned transition date in 2009. The early switch was mainly due to the transmission location being covered with snow on the original switchover mandate of February 2009. KIXE became the second all-digital PBS station in California, after KCSM-TV in San Mateo (which serves the San Francisco Bay Area).

Translators

The cities served by translators (except Big Bend) had cable headends nearby.

Local programs
Current shows:
KIXE Salute to Veterans - aired June 2014, live music and interviews with veteran service groups.
Christmas in the North State - an annual Christmas program featuring local talent.
The Forum - a weekly local talk show hosted by Ashlee Tate and Christy Largent. The show reports on people, businesses and volunteer organizations from throughout the viewing area who are positively influencing their communities. The first episode aired in June 2013.
The Story of Baby Charles - a half-hour program telling the story of the Pioneer Baby's Grave near Old Shasta.

Past shows:
Northstate Profile - a weekly public affairs program
Jobs - a continuing series on employment
Seeking Solutions - a public affairs program on drug abuse
Love Thy Neighbor - a public affairs special about tolerance
Why a Will is Not Enough - a public affairs special regarding estate planning
Challenge of the Minds
Stage Nine
World of Collector Cars (1991-2000) - Hosted by Dale Morris

NATURE: Caught In The Act
NATURE: Caught In The Act is an online film festival hosted by KIXE, in which viewers filmed footage of wildlife and scenery in Northern California and uploaded it to the dedicated website using YouTube. Eight of the 10 submissions were shown on KIXE on October 18 at 7:30 p.m., right before Nature. The program was part of Film Vista and was hosted by assistant producer Matthew Shoutte. The program featured a variety of locations around Northern California including Lassen National Park, Lava Beds National Monument, and Modoc National Wildlife Refuge.

References

External links
 

PBS member stations
Television channels and stations established in 1964
IXE-TV
1964 establishments in California
First Nations Experience affiliates